Super Huey UH-IX (simply Super Huey on some platforms) is a helicopter combat flight simulation  game published by Cosmi Corporation. Originally released for the Commodore 64 in 1985, it was ported to the Amiga, Apple II, Atari ST, Atari 8-bit family, and MS-DOS. Atari Corporation published an Atari 7800 version in 1989.

Gameplay
Super Huey UH-IX is a game in which missions involve combat, rescue and exploration.

Reception
M. Evan Brooks reviewed the game for Computer Gaming World, and stated that "For those desiring an 8-bit helicopter flight simulator, Super Huey and its sequels fill the bill. For those desiring excitement as well, it would pay dividends to look elsewhere."

Reviews
The Games Machine - Oct, 1987
Computer Gaming World - Jun, 1991
Commodore User - Oct, 1987
Popular Computing Weekly - Apr 11, 1985

References

External links
Review in Antic
Review in Commodore Power/Play
Review in Compute!'s Gazette
Review in Info
Review in Page 6
Review in Zzap!
Review in Special Program (Italian)
Review in Videogame & Computer World (Italian)
Review in Current Notes

1985 video games
Amiga games
Apple II games
Atari 7800 games
Atari 8-bit family games
Atari ST games
Combat flight simulators
Commodore 64 games
Cosmi Corporation games
DOS games
Helicopter video games
Video games developed in the United States